{{safesubst:#invoke:RfD|||month = March
|day = 16
|year = 2023
|time = 19:45
|timestamp = 20230316194547

|content=
REDIRECT Scream (cipher) 

}}